Schinia jaegeri is a moth of the family Noctuidae. It is found in southern California and northern Baja California.

The wingspan is about 27 mm.

The larvae feed on Xylorhiza orcuttii and Xylorhiza cognata.

External links
Images
Butterflies and Moths of North America
The Life History of Schinia jaegeri

Schinia
Moths of North America
Moths described in 1940